Crystal is an album by American jazz pianist Ahmad Jamal featuring performances recorded in 1987 and released on the Atlantic label.

Critical reception

In an Allmusic review by Scott Yanow states "There are some magical moments on this quartet set... Jamal's control of dynamics and inventive use of space proved to be as effective as it had been when he first made his mark in the 1950s, although his chord voicings and general style had evolved. Jamal and his group perform ten of his originals with taste, swing and subtle surprises".

Track listing
All compositions by Ahmad Jamal
 "Quest for Light" – 4:48   
 "Arabesque" – 4:48   
 "Avo" – 7:04   
 "Piano Solo" – 1:57   
 "For My Daughter" – 3:34   
 "Perugia" – 3:57   
 "The Last Day" – 6:00   
 "Crystal" – 4:58   
 "Swahililand" – 4:08   
 "The Canteen" – 3:08

Personnel
Ahmad Jamal – piano
James Cammack – bass
David Bowler – drums 
Willie White – percussion

References 

Atlantic Records albums
Ahmad Jamal albums
1987 albums